Robert Gordon Shewan (13 November 1859 – 14 February 1934) was a Scottish businessman in Hong Kong.

Early life
Robert and his twin brother William were born in London on 13 November 1859. They were sons of Andrew Shewan (1820–1873), a master mariner, and Jane (née Thomson) Shewan (1822–1886).

Career
Shewan arrived in Hong Kong in 1881, in the employ of Russell & Company, which was then one of the largest mercantile companies in the Far East. He and Charles Alexander Tomes, who was a grandson of merchant David Hadden, acquired the infrastructure of that firm subsequent to its dissolution in 1891, and consequently created Shewan, Tomes & Co. in 1895. The new company formed the Green Island Cement Company and the China Light and Power Company, which generated electricity for Kowloon. He was subsequently dismissed from the latter by its principal shareholder, the Kadoorie family. Shewan was also the director of the Hongkong and Shanghai Banking Corporation and of many other local companies.

In 1902, Shewan was elected as the representative of the Hong Kong General Chamber of Commerce in the Legislative Council. He also served as Consul for Chile at Hong Kong. Shewan was unsympathetic to the Canton-Hong Kong strike in 1925: he told the Daily Press that employers should punish those of their Chinese labourers who went on strike. He also posted a notice to his office clerks that stated that those who left and did not return by the next morning would be permanently dismissed.

Personal life
Shewan was married to Dorothy "Dolly" Kate Lucas (d. 1961), who was a daughter of William Lucas and former wife of James Marke Wood.

Shewan died on 14 February 1934.  He was buried at the Hong Kong Cemetery in Happy Valley, Hong Kong.

References

External links

1859 births
1934 deaths
Hong Kong businesspeople
Scottish expatriates in Hong Kong
Chairmen of HSBC
Businesspeople from London
Hong Kong people of Scottish descent
Members of the Legislative Council of Hong Kong